Ramón Flores (born August 22, 1946 Mazatlan, Sinaloa, Mexico) is a Mexican trumpet player. He has played with many Mexican and non-Mexican artists, like José José, Juan Gabriel, Paul Mauriat (tour in Japan 1974–1985) and Ray Charles. He has been on world tours with Cock Robin (1990), Brian Setzer (1994), Don Henley (2000), Yanni (2003–2005) and trumpeter Luis Miguel.

Discography 
These are the albums that Flores has recorded with his own music:
 1993: Latin Sunset
 2007: Para Ti
This list may or may not be complete.

Living people
Mexican musicians
Mexican trumpeters
People from Mazatlán
Musicians from Sinaloa
1946 births
21st-century trumpeters